A string octet is a piece of music written for eight string instruments, or sometimes the group of eight players. It usually consists of four violins, two violas and two cellos, or four violins, two violas, a cello and a double bass.

Notable string octets 

Most frequently performed string octets include:
 Felix Mendelssohn – Octet, Op. 20
 Max Bruch – String Octet in B♭ major (with bass replacing the second cello)

Other string octets include:
 Luciano Berio – Korót (eight cellos)
 Sylvano Bussotti – Poésies à Maldoror (eight cellos)
 George Enescu – Octet in C major, Op. 7
 Niels Gade – String Octet in F major, Op. 17
 Reinhold Glière – String Octet in D Major, Op. 5
 Cristóbal Halffter – Fandango (eight cellos)
 Gordon Jacob
 Suite (eight violas)
 Cello Octet (eight cellos) 
 Tomás Marco – Miró (eight cellos)
 Darius Milhaud – Octet for Strings, Op. 291
 Arvo Pärt
 Fratres (version for eight cellos)
 L'abbé Agathon (eight cellos)
 Steve Reich – Cello Counterpoint (eight cellos)
 Kaija Saariaho – Neiges (eight cellos)
 Gunther Schuller – Hommage a Rayechka (eight cellos)
 Peter Sculthorpe – Chorale (eight cellos)
 Dmitri Shostakovich – Two Pieces for String Octet
 Giovanni Sollima – Violoncelles, vibrez! (eight cellos)
 Louis Spohr – Double Quartets Op. 65, 77, 87, 136
 Johan Svendsen – String Octet in A major, Op. 3

See also 
 String trio
 String quartet
 String quintet
 String sextet
 Violin octet

Chamber music
Types of musical groups